Jimmy Janssens (born 30 May 1989) is a Belgian cyclist, who currently rides for UCI ProTeam .

Major results

2011
 2nd Overall Vuelta a la Comunidad de Madrid Sub 23
 5th Overall Cinturó de l'Empordà
2012
 2nd Flèche Ardennaise
 4th Overall Vuelta Ciclista a León
2014
 4th Circuit de Wallonie
2015
 5th Internationale Wielertrofee Jong Maar Moedig
2016
 1st Mountains classification, Flèche du Sud
 1st Mountains classification, Ronde de l'Oise
 1st  Mountains classification, Ster ZLM Toer
2017
 4th Overall Tour de Savoie Mont-Blanc
1st Stage 1
 8th Duo Normand (with Gianni Marchand)
 9th Overall Kreiz Breizh Elites
 10th Dwars door het Hageland
2018
 2nd Flèche Ardennaise
 3rd Overall Flèche du Sud
1st Stage 4
 3rd Overall Tour de Taiwan
1st Mountains classification
 3rd Volta Limburg Classic
 3rd Druivenkoers Overijse
 4th Tour de Vendée
 5th Overall Kreiz Breizh Elites
1st Stage 3
 5th Tour du Finistère
 5th Duo Normand (with Gianni Marchand)
2019
 2nd Memorial Rik Van Steenbergen
 3rd Overall Étoile de Bessèges
 3rd Overall Tour Alsace
 6th Heistse Pijl
 9th Overall Tour de la Provence
2020
 9th Overall Étoile de Bessèges
2022
 5th Paris–Camembert

Grand Tour general classification results timeline

References

External links

1989 births
Living people
Belgian male cyclists
People from Herentals
Cyclists from Antwerp Province
21st-century Belgian people